The women's 9-ball singles event at the 2017 Summer Universiade was held on 25 and 27 August at the Expo Dome, Taipei Expo Park.

Medallist

Results

Bronze Medal

References

External links 
 2017 Summer Universiade – Billiards

Women's singles 9-ball